Robeschia is a genus of flowering plants belonging to the family Brassicaceae.

Its native range is Eastern Mediterranean to Pakistan.

Species:
 Robeschia schimperi (Boiss.) O.E.Schulz

References

Brassicaceae
Brassicaceae genera